The 2019 WNBA All-Star Game was an exhibition basketball game played on July 27, 2019. The Las Vegas Aces hosted the WNBA All-Star Game for the first time.

Rosters

Selection
On June 12, the WNBA announced that 2019 would similar roster selection process to the 2018 WNBA All-Star Game. Fans, WNBA players, head coaches, sports writers, and broadcasters would all be able to vote for All Stars. All groups could fill out a ballot of four guards and six front court players. Players and coaches could not vote for members of their own team. Voting began on June 14, 2019, at 2 PM EDT and ended on July 9, 2019, at 2 PM EDT.

The voting was weighted as follows: 

Players were not allowed to vote for their own teammates. The top 10 players receiving votes based on this weighting would be selected to the All-Star Game. These ten players would be deemed the starters. The starters were revealed on July 11, 2019. After the announcement of the starters, the WNBA's head coaches selected the 12 reserves. Coaches voted for three guards, five frontcourt players, and four players at either position regardless of conference. They could not vote for their own players. The reserves were announced on Monday, July 15. The top two vote-getters were captains of the two All-Star teams and selected their teams from the pool of 8 remaining starters and the 12 reserves. On July 18, it was announced that the selection process would be televised on ESPN2. The selection show aired on July 23, at 9:30 PM ET, prior to the Seattle Storm vs. Las Vegas Aces game that was also televised on ESPN2.

Head coaches
The head coaches of the two teams will be the head coaches from the two WNBA teams with the best records following games on July 12. On July 11, it was determined that Bill Laimbeer of the Las Vegas Aces and Mike Thibault of the Washington Mystics would be the two All-Star Head Coaches, as their teams had the best records in the WNBA. Laimbeer would coach Team Delle Donne, as the Aces had the best record and Delle Donne had the most All-Star votes. That left Thibault to coach Team Wilson. For both coaches, this was their third time coaching in an All-Star Game.

All-Star Pool 
The players for the All-Star Game were selected by the voting process described above. The starters were announced on July 11, 2019, with Elena Delle Donne and A'ja Wilson leading the vote meaning they would be captains of the two All-Star teams. The player line-up was completed when the reserves were announced on July 15, 2019. On July 22, 2019, the league announced that Napheesa Collier was selected as a replacement player for the injured A'ja Wilson.

All-Star Selections per team
The Las Vegas Aces, Chicago Sky, and Minnesota Lynx led the league with three players selected to the All-Star team. No players were selected from the Atlanta Dream or the Dallas Wings.

Final rosters

 Rosters as of July 16, 2019.
 A'ja Wilson was unable to play due to injury.
 Napheesa Collier was selected as Wilson's replacement.
 Allie Quigley was selected to start in place of Wilson.

Game

Two rule changes were implemented for the game:
 A 20-second shot clock.
 Substitutions were allowed during live play.

Source:

Three-Point Contest & Skills Challenge
On June 17, 2019, it was announced that there would be a Three-Point Contest and Skills challenge on July 25, the night before the All-Star game. This marked the first time these two events had been held since 2006.

Rules
The Three-Point Contest is a two-round, timed competition in which five shooting locations are positioned around the three-point arc. Four racks contain four WNBA balls (each worth one point) and one “money” ball (worth two points). The fifth station is a special “all money ball” rack, which each participant can place at any of the five locations. Every ball on this rack is worth two points. The players have one minute to shoot as many of the 25 balls as they can. The two competitors with the highest scores in the first round advance to the championship round.

The Skills Challenge will be a three-round, obstacle-course competition that tests dribbling, passing, agility and three-point shooting skills. The event will showcase a head-to-head, bracket-style tournament format.

Three-Point Contest

Skills Challenge

References

WNBA All-Star Game
Women's National Basketball Association All-Star Game
WNBA All-Star Game